Amin Khani *Alexamin, AmineLL* (Persian: امین خانی; born November 25, 1989) is an Iranian EDM artist, music/record producer,  remixer, DJ, singer, topliner, songwriter, writer, mod designer for video games, voice actor and model.

Amin Khani *Alexamin, AmineLL* had collaborated and supported by various international record labels, radio stations, djs, artists, actors, models and YouTubers such as Unkle Bob, Dj Yasser (BBC Presenter & DJ), SEBAZTI, Emma Heesters, MADYX, Wengie, Rebecca Black and many other artists with his original music, covers, official and unofficial remixes. His music and remixes got several million views and plays from all around the world.

Honours & Music Experiences
On 18 Dec 2017, Square Enix and Final Fantasy video game have shared and featured Amin Khani's remix for 'FINAL FANTASY 30th Anniversary Fan Tribute' on their official Square Enix, Final Fantasy and FFXV website, YouTube, Twitter, Facebook and the other social medias.

On May 6, 2016, Amin's remix for Emma Heesters & Mike Attinger's cover of We Don't Talk Anymore by Charlie Puth and Selena Gomez became official. Alexamin's remix has been published by Instrumental (a part of Warner Music Group) label. His remix has been used by so many users on TikTok.

Amin Khani has made so many other remixes for original and cover version of the popular songs and artists such as:

Amin Khani has made mods for various video games and as a voice actor had collaborated with one of the most famous modders "Mihail" for The Elder Scrolls V: Skyrim, mainly on specific versions of his creatures such as Liches, also they've been used in other users and modders' mods and mod packs for The Elder Scrolls V: Skyrim, The Elder Scrolls V: Skyrim Special Edition and VR version of the game. They can be found on Nexus Mods and also they've been ported by other users to Bethesda.net for Xbox One as well.

Amin Khani's been signed to various record labels, such as frtyfve/Instrumental.

Since the last update, Amin Khani has made so many new original music and remixes, a full track list and album could be found on Amin Khani's official pages.

Artists that could be found on Amin Khani's pages (Collaborations, official and unofficial remixes):

 This list is outdated and could be updated via Amin Khani *Alexamin, AmineLL*'s official SoundCloud, YouTube and other social media pages such as:

His other pages from other social media and platforms can be found via Google search.

Signed Remix

Label: frtyfve/Instrumental

We Don't Talk Anymore Remix - 2016 
 Charlie Puth ft. Selena Gomez - We Don't Talk Anymore (Emma Heesters & Mike Attinger Cover) (Alexamin Remix)
_

 Tunes are listed by Amin Khani's official SoundCloud, YouTube, Spotify, Beatport and the other sources.

References

21st-century Iranian musicians
1989 births
Living people
Musicians from Tehran